Arctostaphylos manzanita subsp. elegans, also known as the Konocti manzanita, is a subspecies of the Common manzanita. It is endemic to California. It was originally described at the rank of species as Arctostaphylos elegans in 1893 by Willis Linn Jepson. It was reduced to a subspecies of Arctostaphylos manzanita by Philipp Vincent Wells in 1968.

References

manzanita subsp. elegans
Endemic flora of California
Natural history of the California chaparral and woodlands
Natural history of the California Coast Ranges
Plant subspecies
Plants described in 1893
Taxa named by Willis Linn Jepson
Flora without expected TNC conservation status